Pomeranian dialect may refer to:
East Pomeranian
Central Pomeranian
Mecklenburgisch-Vorpommersch
Pomeranian language and Kashubian language, sometimes regarded as dialects of Polish

pl:Dialekt pomorski